Thacholi Varghese Chekavar is a 1995 Indian Malayalam-language action thriller film directed by T. K. Rajeev Kumar and written by P. Balachandran, starring Mohanlal in the title role, along with Urmila Matondkar and Vineeth. The film features a soundtrack composed by Sharreth.

The plot follows Varghese, a Kalaripayattu expert who is persuaded by his favourite disciple Shyam to rescue his lover Maya from house arrest. Varghese kidnaps her but soon realises that Shyam lied and Maya is the only witness of a homicide.

Plot 
Varghese is a Kalari master, and Shyam, his favourite disciple. One day, he comes to his master, declaring his love for Maya. He says that her parents have kept her under house arrest, and he needs his help to rescue her.

Varghese kidnaps Maya and brings her to Shyam, but Shyam tries to kill her. Varghese understands that Shyam is not her lover, and she is the only witness in another homicide which involves Shyam. But Maya tells Varghese that Shyam is innocent. Shyam, who still does not know this, pursues her. Varghese conceals her and brings the real culprit out by means of a rare locket that Maya remembers the killer wearing.

Cast

Soundtrack
The film features original songs and score composed by Sharreth. The soundtrack album was released by Millennium Audios and Sony Music Entertainment.

References

External links
 

1995 films
1990s Malayalam-language films
1995 action thriller films
Kalarippayattu films
Films directed by T. K. Rajeev Kumar
Indian action thriller films
Films scored by Sharreth